Redkey Historic District is a national historic district located at Redkey, Jay County, Indiana.  It encompasses 25 contributing buildings in the central business district of Redkey.  The district developed between about 1888 and 1935, and includes notable examples of Italianate, Romanesque Revival, and Classical Revival style architecture. Notable buildings include the City Building (1905), Appenseller's Department Store (1906), K of P Building (1911), Farmers and Merchants First National Bank Building (c. 1910), Masonic Lodge (c. 1890, 1910), IOOF Building (c. 1895), Brown-Ellis Block (1888), and Cultice-Mann Block (1891).

It was listed on the National Register of Historic Places in 1992.

References

Historic districts on the National Register of Historic Places in Indiana
Italianate architecture in Indiana
Romanesque Revival architecture in Indiana
Neoclassical architecture in Indiana
Historic districts in Jay County, Indiana
National Register of Historic Places in Jay County, Indiana